SV Rot-Weiss Hasborn-Dautweiler is a German association football club from Tholey, Saarland.



History
Sportverein Hasborn was established in 1920 and spent most of its early history in lower-level competition. The club first came to notice in 1964 when it advanced to the 1. Amateurliga Rheinland, then a third tier division. Rot-Weiß Hasborn won promotion to the Oberliga Südwest (IV) in 1981 and has since moved frequently between the fourth tier Oberliga and the Verbandsliga Saar (V). In 1991 and 2007 the team captured the Saarlandpokal (Saarland Cup).

SVs first DFB-Pokal (German Cup) appearance came in 1976 when they made it through the first round before being put out 0:3 by Borussia Mönchengladbach. In their most recent appearance in cup play in 2008 the team was beaten 0:8 in an opening round match versus Hansa Rostock.

After another relegation from the Oberliga in 2011 the club now plays in the Saarlandliga.

Honours
The club's honours:
 Verbandsliga Saarland (IV-V)
 Champions: 1981, 1987, 2005
 Saarland Cup'
 Winners: 1991, 2007

Recent seasons
The recent season-by-season performance of the club:

 With the introduction of the Regionalligas in 1994 and the 3. Liga in 2008 as the new third tier, below the 2. Bundesliga, all leagues below dropped one tier. The Saarlandliga was introduced in 2009 and replaced the Verbandsliga Saarland at the sixth tier of football in the Saarland.

References

External links
Official team site
 Das deutsche Fußball-Archiv historical German domestic league tables 

Football clubs in Germany
Football clubs in Rhineland-Palatinate
Football clubs in Saarland
Association football clubs established in 1920
1920 establishments in Germany